United Nations Security Council Resolution 1957, adopted unanimously on 15 December 2010, after recognising positive developments in Iraq since the adoption of 661 (1990), the Council lifted sanctions relating to weapons of mass destruction, long-range ballistic missiles, and the acquisition of nuclear weapons.

Resolution 1957, along with resolutions 1956 (2010) and 1958 (2010), ended some major restrictions placed on Iraq. However, demands that Iraq resolve disputes with Kuwait remained. The high-level meeting was chaired by United States Vice President Joe Biden.

Resolution

Observations
In the preamble of the resolution, the Council welcomed a letter by the Foreign Minister Hoshyar Zebari which confirmed the Iraqi government's support for non-proliferation and disarmament regimes. It also welcomed that the International Atomic Energy Agency had reported good co-operation with Iraq, which had become the 186th state to subscribe to the Chemical Weapons Convention and the 131st to sign the International Code of Conduct against Ballistic Missile Proliferation.

Acts
Acting under Chapter VII of the United Nations Charter, the Council ended the weapons of mass destruction, missile, and civil nuclear-related measures imposed in resolutions 687 (1991) and 707 (1991). It urged Iraq to ratify the Comprehensive Nuclear-Test-Ban Treaty and the Additional Protocol to the Comprehensive Safeguards Agreement. The Council stated it would review progress made by Iraq in a year.

See also
 Iraq and weapons of mass destruction
 Iraq War
 List of United Nations Security Council Resolutions 1901 to 2000 (2009–2011)
 Post-invasion Iraq
 United Nations Assistance Mission in Iraq

References

External links
 
Text of the Resolution at undocs.org
Fact Sheet on United Nations Security Council High-Level Meeting, White House.

 1957
 1957
2010 in Iraq
Iraq and weapons of mass destruction
December 2010 events